The Great Lakes Aquarium opened in 2000 and is located on the Duluth waterfront. A 501(c)(3) private nonprofit, Great Lakes Aquarium features animals and habitats found within the Great Lakes basin and other freshwater ecosystems such as the Amazon River. The Aquarium houses 205 different species of fish, birds, reptiles, amphibians, and mammals. It is one of few aquariums in the United States that focuses predominantly on freshwater exhibits.

Many of the main exhibits at  Great Lakes Aquarium (GLA) are based upon actual habitats in the Lake Superior basin. "Slices" of the Saint Louis River, Baptism River, Pictured Rocks National Lakeshore, Kakagon Slough, Isle Royale and Otter Cove can all be viewed up close.

Permanent fixtures

Isle Royale
The  Isle Royale is the main exhibit located in the very center of the building, and it extends to both the first and second floors allowing visitors to view it from many different angles. It contains trout and lake sturgeon.

Baptism River
Baptism River is a fast-moving exhibit featuring a waterfall. It contains kamloops and siscowet.

Saint Louis River
The Saint Louis River exhibit is a slow-moving river habitat with perch, walleye, sturgeon, channel catfish, and other native species.

Otter Cove
Otter Cove is an exhibit featuring two North American river otters, Agate and Ore. The female otters, believed to be sisters, arrived at the Aquarium in early 2014. They were captured in live traps near a crayfish farm in Louisiana when they were not yet 2-years-old. Great Lakes Aquarium acquired Agate and Ore through a special program to relocate otters that might otherwise have been exterminated as "nuisance animals". Otter Cove was designed after a cove in Pukaskwa National Park in Ontario. Directly to the left is an exhibit containing a crow named Freeway.

Amazing Amazon
Amazing Amazon opened in the summer of 2008. It features freshwater creatures from the largest river in the world. This includes Pacu, Arowana, Piranha, Catfish, Electric Eels, Discus.

Unsalted Seas
Opened in 2016, Unsalted Seas explores large lakes of the world and the animals that call them home. The exhibit features the largest sturgeon touch pool in North America with a primary focus on sturgeon from Russian and North Asian waters. Several species of those sturgeon including Beluga, Sevruga, Sterlet and Osetra came from Sturgeon Aquafarms in Florida.

Raptor Ridge
Opened in 2019, Raptor Ridge is home to a non-releasable Bald Eagle and Turkey Vulture. This exhibit explores migration, rehabilitation, and care of birds of prey species.

Origins
Origins explores how life came to be today. Follow the earths timeline from before animals appeared to current day. Animals featured include Corals, Invertebrates, Alligators, Horseshoe crabs, Grayling, Opossums, and Skunks

Critter Corner
A variety of animals that are often taken out for programs and other education opportunities. Including a Jellyfish and Tidepool Touch experiences.

Aquatic Invaders
An exhibit featuring invasive species from around the world

Other Permanent Exhibits
Satellite tanks are at various locations and contain animals such as fish, frogs, salamanders and snakes. There is also a wide variety of interactive electronic exhibits located throughout the museum. Great Lakes Aquarium also features a local history center, a science center and cultural exhibits.

Rotating Exhibits
The current exhibit opened in July 2014. Titled "Shipwrecks Alive!" It features how sea life makes their home in shipwrecks. It profiles the wreck of the SS America which wrecked in 1918 near Isle Royal. In May 2010, Great Lakes Aquarium opened rotating exhibit "Masters of Disguise" in the Sandra and Roger Karon Exhibit Hall. This intriguing attraction explores camouflage, coloring, mimicry and other visual tricks and behaviors that help sea creatures and land animals hide in plain sight. Shape-shifting fish, plant-like insects and color-changing reptiles are among the many new creatures featured. Prior rotating exhibits include "The Abyss: the Great Unknown" which ended in 2010, "Africa's Lake Victoria" which ended in 2003 and "Hunters of the Sky" which ended in September 2001.

Architecture

Construction took 3.5 years and cost around $34 million. An office area at the rear of the first floor has been cleared out to host conferences, birthday parties and other pre-arranged events. There are harbor views from this area and other parts of the museum. When visitors enter the museum, they are encouraged to ride the escalator to the upper level first through Sensory Immersion Experience and continue onto the lower level later.

History
Great Lakes Aquarium opened its doors on July 29, 2000. It was built (on land donated by Duluth philanthropists Julia and Caroline Marshall) with a combination of state and local funds as well more than $6 million in private donations. While well attended in those opening months, construction delays resulted in a loss of around 30% of anticipated revenues that year. In 2002, Mayor Gary Doty appointed a task force to improve the facility's long-term viability.  Later that year the city took over managerial control of the Aquarium and briefly closed it. 
In May 2003, management of Great Lakes Aquarium was turned over to Ripley's Entertainment, Leisure Entertainment Corporation, best known for its "Believe it or Not" museums. The company eliminated 2/3 of aquarium staff and cut costs, bringing it back from the immediate threat of permanent closure. Under successive declining years of attendance, Ripley's ended its relationship with the Aquarium in 2007. 
At that time, the board of directors decided to return management of the facility back to local control and recruited Jack LaVoy to serve as executive director. Since 2008, a philosophy of continuous improvement has been adopted starting with a program called "The Three R's"; repair, replace or remove all defective exhibits from the exhibit floor.  
Plans for new exhibit galleries and expanded educational outreach are ongoing.  
GLA is a not-for-profit 501(c)3 organization.

See also
"A Walking Tour of Great Lakes Aquarium" volunteer orientation manual

References

External links
 
 live camera of THE Great Lakes Aquarium
 NPR article
 Great Lakes Aquarium 5-year Anniversary
 "More from the Sturgeon General," Lake Superior Magazine

Aquaria in Minnesota
Buildings and structures in Duluth, Minnesota
Tourist attractions in Duluth, Minnesota
Museums in Duluth, Minnesota
Natural history museums in Minnesota
Duluth, Minnesota